Statistics of Dhivehi League in the 1987 season.

Overview
New Radiant SC won the championship.

References
RSSSF

Dhivehi League seasons
Maldives
Maldives
Dhivehi